The Christ Episcopal Church and Rectory in Sheridan, Montana is a property listed on the National Register of Historic Places.  It includes a one-story church built of local granite, with two gables facing onto Main Street.  To its west is a two-story gambrel roofed rectory built in 1906, also of the local granite.  As of 1987, a c.1960 parish hall stood between them, and there was a c.1900 wood-frame garage at the back of the property.

The church has an open bell tower that was added in 1901.

The church probably was designed by architect George Hancock.

References

Churches on the National Register of Historic Places in Montana
Churches completed in 1896
Episcopal church buildings in Montana
19th-century Episcopal church buildings
National Register of Historic Places in Madison County, Montana
Houses on the National Register of Historic Places in Montana